Syngnathoidea is a superfamily of the pipefish order Syngnathiformes. It is divided into two families, the speciose pipefish Syngnathidae, which includes the sea horses and monotypic Solenostomidae, the ghost pipefishes, which has just five species. The superfamily occurs worldwide in tropical, subtropical and temperate seas, especially in coastal waters around rock and coral reefs and among sea weed and sea grass beds. However, there are also pelagic species of pipefish and even freshwater species. In total the superfamily comprises in excess of 50 genera and nearly 300 species.

Classification
The superfamily Syngnathoidea contains the following families and subfamilies:

Superfamily Syngnathoidea 
 Family Solenostomidae Nardo, 1843 (ghost pipefishes) 
 Family Syngnathidae Bonaparte, 1831 (pipefishes and seahorses) 
 Subfamily Syngnathinae Bonaparte, 1831 (pipefishes)
 Subfamily Hippocampinae Bonaparte, 1835 (sea horses and pygmy pipefishes)

References

Syngnathiformes